"ABQ" is the thirteenth and final episode of the second season of the American television crime drama series Breaking Bad.

This episode introduces cleaner and hitman Mike Ehrmantraut (Jonathan Banks).

Plot 
In a flashforward, National Transportation Safety Board investigators catalog debris, including a half-burnt pink teddy bear, that has fallen around the Whites' pool. Two columns of smoke rise in the distance. In the present, Jesse Pinkman wakes from his heroin-induced sleep to find Jane Margolis dead, having choked on her own vomit. Horrified, Jesse contacts Walter White. Walt calls Saul Goodman, who sends a cleaner, Mike Ehrmantraut, to remove evidence of drugs from Jesse's apartment. Jane's father Donald arrives at the apartment and discovers she has died. Jesse blames himself for Jane's death and runs off to a crack house. Walt locates Jesse and takes him to a rehab clinic.

Walt is preparing to undergo surgery to remove his cancer. The website that Walter Jr. made to bring in anonymous donationsin reality being used by Saul to launder Walt's drug moneygarners media attention due to its apparent success; Walt is uncomfortable in the spotlight due to the pity instilled upon him and the potential of someone in the drug trade recognizing him on television. On the day of Walt's operation, as he is put under anesthetics, he reveals the existence of a second cell phone he uses, making Skyler White suspicious of his activities. When Walt is released from the hospital six weeks later, Skyler reveals that she has investigated his behavior over the past several months and found he has lied to her many times. Walt offers to tell her everything, but she is too afraid to know and asks him to leave.

Donald returns to work as an air traffic controller. While on the job, his mind wanders to Jane and he inadvertently allows the flight path of a commercial airliner to cross the space of a small corporate turboprop over Albuquerque. Walt sits beside his swimming pool as he is startled by an explosion overhead. As he watches the midair collision in horror, the teddy bear lands in the pool.

Production 
The episode was written by Vince Gilligan, and directed by Adam Bernstein. It aired on AMC in the United States and Canada on May 31, 2009. The plane crash at the end of the episode was inspired by the 1986 Cerritos mid-air collision. Coincidentally, Walter White, Breaking Bad'''s protagonist, shares his name with an air traffic controller involved in the Cerritos collision.

This episode introduced the character of Mike as played by Jonathan Banks. The role of the cleaner to help Jesse prepare to deal with the police was originally meant to be handled by Saul Goodman, played by Bob Odenkirk. However, due to commitments to How I Met Your Mother, he was not available for filming of this episode - so Vince Gilligan created Mike for that episode and into the next season as a cleaner.

 Critical reception 
The episode received critical acclaim. Donna Bowman, writing for The A.V. Club, commented that the episode "was horrific perfection".

In 2019 The Ringer ranked "ABQ" as the 28th best out of the 62 total Breaking Bad episodes.

For her work on this episode, Lynne Willingham won Outstanding Single-Camera Picture Editing for a Drama Series at the 61st Primetime Creative Arts Emmy Awards, while Michael Slovis was nominated for Outstanding Cinematography for a Single-Camera Series (One Hour).

Notes

 References 

 External links 
 "ABQ" at the official Breaking Bad'' site
 

2009 American television episodes
Breaking Bad (season 2) episodes
Television episodes written by Vince Gilligan